The following are partial lists of the Forbes list of Chinese billionaires (converted into USD) and is based on an annual assessment of wealth and assets compiled and published by Forbes magazine in 2022. In 2022 China had 607 billionaires which put the country second in the world, after the United States (735).

Current richest Chinese billionaire is Zhong Shanshan, ranked as the eighth wealthiest man in the world as of March 11, 2022.

2022 Chinese billionaires top 100 list 
The hundred entrepreneurs billionaires are listed as follows, including their China rank (S#) and world rank (W#), citizenship, age, net worth, and source of wealth:

See also
 Forbes list of billionaires
 Hurun Report
 List of countries by the number of billionaires
 List of wealthiest families

References

External links
 China Rich List 
 Hurun Rich List – China's richest people (2020) by the Hurun Report

 
People by net worth
New worth
Chinese
Net worth